Universidad Autónoma de Zacatecas FC is a Mexican football club.  They reside in Zacatecas, Zacatecas. The club currently places in the Segunda División de México and would not be eligible for promotion, since the club does not count with a stadium with a capacity of 15,000. The clubs represents the Autonomous University of Zacatecas.

Current roster
 Updated on August 29, 2011.

Footnotes

External links
Tercera división
Universidad Autónoma de Zacatecas

Zacatecas City
Football clubs in Zacatecas
Association football clubs established in 2006
2006 establishments in Mexico